St. Frances Cabrini Church was a Roman Catholic church in New Orleans, Louisiana; the heart of the parish of the same name in the Archdiocese of New Orleans.  The parish was located in an area bounded by Lake Pontchartrain, Mid-City and two major canals, including the London Avenue Canal.

The church was damaged by Hurricane Katrina. Despite a battle with the U.S. Federal Preservation to preserve it, the modernist structure was demolished in 2007.

History

The parish was carved from St. Raphael Parish in 1953 and the original church was but a small quonset hut built by the men in the parish.  They later added an extension wing to it, to make the quonset hut L-shaped to accommodate the growing neighborhood and population in the parish.  The quonset hut was accidentally burned to the ground one early morning in 1961 due to an electrical fire.

Plans for a new church were already underway when the quonset hut had burned down.  The gymnasium of St. Joseph Academy was temporarily used to conduct Masses and other church services until the new church was built.  In 1963, the new church structure was completed; it was a masterpiece in architectural design and modernity.  The modern stained glass and sweeping arcs of the white roof curved up to the tallest white steeple and steel cross ever seen in this part of the residential lakefront section of New Orleans. The altar of the church was an enormous and masterful single carving in one piece of marble, commissioned in Italy.  The altar crucifix was similarly imported. It was a three-dimensional wooden image of the resurrected Christ that was suspended by steel cables that appeared nearly invisible to the naked eye. This very large statue of the risen Christ with flowing robe ascending above the altar provided a unique and reverential atmosphere from all other churches in the city of New Orleans. The pews were made of blanched wood, and the floors a white terrazzo which all further lightened the atmosphere to an almost ethereal quality within the church, especially when reflecting sunlight through the stained glass around the roof's modern arcs. The bottom of the church's great steeple dove past the roof down into the church as four curved pillars and represented structural yet graceful markings bounding the altar area.

The parish had also built a parochial grammar school, St. Frances Cabrini School, for grades kindergarten through eighth grade on the same campus grounds as the church quonset hut and rectory house. Years later, a second building on the campus grounds was built, called the towers, which provided for additional classroom facilities for the grammar school.

Years later with more growth the parish and the archdiocese contributed to building an all-girls parochial high school, St. Joseph's Academy, across the street from the campus.

Hurricane Katrina 

The Archdiocese of New Orleans decided to not try and refurbish the church, instead choosing to demolish it and collect the USD 9 million in insurance money, distributing these funds to other parishes that didn't have insurance. The decision was partly because the church's roof was very challenging and costly to maintain, requiring constant repairs which often went beyond the parish's means.
 
The neighborhoods near this parish, including Gentilly where the parish existed, were slow to repopulate after Katrina.  The parish members who could attend met several times with the Archdiocese of New Orleans to discuss its rebuilding plans. The Archdiocese declared that it was not planning on bringing  the two schools on the campus grounds back to life since they had not yet seen sufficient population in the area to justify this very expensive endeavor.  The majority of parish members voted to sell the parish's campus grounds to Holy Cross High School, a parochial all-boys school for grades 5 through 12. Formerly located in the Lower Ninth Ward of New Orleans, Holy Cross school was also damaged by Katrina. 

Preservation advocates, along with former and current parishioners, appealed to the U.S. Federal Preservation authorities to prevent Holy Cross from demolishing St. Frances Cabrini Church, citing its historical significance and magnificence for modern architecture of that era. Holy Cross's plans were in jeopardy for a period of time while the preservation review took place.  Subsequently, the review resulted in acknowledging the historical significance and magnificence of the church's architecture and history, but stopped short of requiring that the church must be preserved.

References

External links

Roman Catholic churches in New Orleans
Christian organizations established in 1950
1953 establishments in Louisiana